The Battle of Hira was fought between the Sasanian Empire and the Rashidun Caliphate in 633. It was one of the early battles of the Muslim conquest of Persia, and the loss of the frontier city on the Euphrates River opened the way to the Sasanian capital at Ctesiphon on the Tigris River.

Context 

The city of Al-Hirah, widely known for its size and wealth, had been capital of the Lakhmid kingdom for centuries. It was annexed as a Sasanian frontier province in 602. During the expansion of the Caliphate in 633, Caliph Abu Bakr, sent Khalid ibn al-Walid to capture the lands south of the Euphrates (the as-Sawad).

After taking Ullais in May, the Muslim army under Khalid ibn al-Walid attacked the city of Hira in the last week of that month. The defenders briefly sequestered themselves in the city's fortresses, but after brief fighting, the city quickly surrendered. The inhabitants paid a large tribute to spare the city, and agreed to act as spies against the Sasanians, just as the inhabitants of Ullais had.

References

Battles of Khalid ibn Walid
Battles involving the Rashidun Caliphate
Battles involving the Sasanian Empire
Muslim conquest of Mesopotamia
Military history of Iraq
633
Hira